is the future Buddha in Buddhist eschatology.

 may also refer to:

 Maitreya (Mahābhārata), a sage in the Indian epic Mahabharata
 Maitreya (Share International), an organization that has stated Maitreya has been living in London, England since the 1970s 
 Maitreya (Theosophy), a member of the Theosophical "Masters of the Ancient Wisdom"
 Maitreya-nātha, the reputed co-author of a number of Yogacara Buddhist treatises
 Maitreya Great Tao, a Yiguandao splinter sect founded by Wang Hao-te
 Maitreya teachings, a set of beliefs that developed in China as early as the 6th century CE
 Maitreya Upanishad, one of the minor scriptures of Hinduism
 Akshay Kumar Maitreya, Indian historian and social worker
 Arya Maitreya Mandala, a Tibetan Buddhism Order founded by Anagarika Govinda
 Balangoda Ananda Maitreya Thero, a Sri Lankan monk and scholar
 Sananda Maitreya (fka Terence Trent D'Arby), an American singer-songwriter

See also
 Maitreya Festival Electronic dance music festival with an alternative-lifestyle focus, held annually in Australia since 2008
 Maitreya Project International organization originally set up to construct a 500ft-high statue of Maitreya Buddha
 Gilt-bronze Maitreya in Meditation Buddhist sculptures designated Korean National Treasures
 Maha Vihara Maitreya One of the largest Buddhist temples in Indonesia
 Paradise of Maitreya Dry fresco painting by Zhu Haogu, created during the Yuan Dynasty
 Benjamin Creme Scottish author who promoted an interpretation of Maitreya